Events in the year 1600 in the Spanish Netherlands and Prince-bishopric of Liège (predecessor states of modern Belgium).

Incumbents

Habsburg Netherlands
Sovereigns – Archdukes Albert and Isabella

Prince-Bishopric of Liège
Prince-Bishop – Ernest of Bavaria

Events
February
 5 February — Battle of Lekkerbeetje

April
 28 April — Estates General opens in Brussels (dissolved 9 November)

July
 2 July — Battle of Nieuwpoort

Publications
 Martin Delrio, Disquisitionum Magicarum, volumes 2 and 3 (Leuven, Gerard Rivius). Volume 3 available on Google Books
 Giulio Fazio, S.J., Van 't versterven der menschelijcker affectien, translated from Italian to Dutch by Thomas Sailly, S.J. (Antwerp, Joachim Trognaesius) – a treatise on mortification. Available on Google Books
 Jean-Baptiste Gramaye, Andromede Belgica dicta Alberto Austriaco, Isabellae Clarae Eugeniae acta a Falconis alumnis, tertio ab inauguratis principibus die (Leuven, Laurence Kellam)
 John Hamilton, A facile traictise, contenand, first ane infallible reul to discerne trew from fals religion: nixt a declaration of the nature, numbre, vertew and effects of the sacraments togider with certaine prayeres of devotion (Leuven, Laurence Kellam)
 Francesco Petrarca, Le Petrarque en rime francoise, translated from Italian to French by Philippe de Maldeghem (Brussels, Rutger Velpius).
 Cornelius Columbanus Vrancx, Den spieghel oft practijcke der charitaten (Ghent, Gauthier Manilius) — a treatise on charity. Available on Google Books.
 Johannes Wamesius, Tractatus de appellationibus (Leuven, Gerard Rivius)

Births
 23 January — Alexander Keirincx, painter (d. 1652)
 15 July — Jan Cossiers, painter (d. 1671)
 date uncertain
 Albert de Ligne, Prince of Barbançon (d. 1674)

Deaths
 5 February — Gerard Abrahams, cavalry commander 
 September
 Jacques Colaert, privateer
 Claude Le Jeune, composer
 17 October — Cornelis de Jode, cartographer, engraver and publisher
 date uncertain 
 Volcxken Diericx, printmaker
 Simon Pereyns, painter

References

 
1600 in the Holy Roman Empire